Alice Knott is a 2020 novel by American author Blake Butler. The novel concerns the theft and destruction of a painting collection and its impact on the painting's original owner, the titular Alice Knott. In The Nation, Brooks Sterritt wrote that the book "...resonates so strongly with life under lockdown", though noting that the book was completed before the 2020 pandemic.

Development and writing
Butler's earliest inspiration for the book was a note written to himself reading “Corporation that buys and destroys art”. He was further inspired by the Thomas Pynchon novel The Crying of Lot 49.

Reception
Critics highlighted that the book could be challenging.

References

2020 American novels
Riverhead Books books
Novels about artists